This is a listing of programs that Spectrum has commissioned or co-commissioned.  The shows produced for Spectrum are dubbed "Spectrum Originals"

Original programming

Drama

Comedy

Co-productions
These shows have been commissioned by Spectrum in cooperation with a partner network.

Continuations
These shows have been picked up by Spectrum for additional seasons after having aired previous seasons on another network.

Exclusive international distribution/Co-productions
These shows have been acquired by Spectrum for exclusive first-run release in the United States.

Upcoming original programming

Co-productions

References

Spectrum Originals original programming
Spectrum